Windsor is a town of 5,300 people, part of the Le Val-Saint-François Regional County Municipality in the Estrie region of Quebec, Canada.

Windsor is perhaps best known for its ultra-modern Domtar fine paper plant.

History
Apart from the Abenaki Indian camps in this area in the 1600s, Windsor was unpopulated until the early 19th century, when Governor General Prescott granted a tract of land to Joseph Brown to thank him for his service to the Crown. In 1876, when French-Canadian colonist Michel Cloutier acquired land, a rift grew between Francophones and Anglophones, with one side locating in the Township municipality and the other in the village of Windsor Mills. Windsor Mills was elevated to town status in 1899, and took its current name in 1914. The name originates from the village of Berkshire, where Windsor Castle, built ca. 1344 at the request of King Edward III, is located. While most of Windsor's economy is built on the pulp and paper industry and textile manufacturing, there are also some worthy attractions. This includes the Poudrière de Windsor, which manufactured black explosive powder in Canada around 1864.

During World War II the Royal Canadian Air Force built and operated No. 4 Elementary Flying Training School as part of the British Commonwealth Air Training Plan near Windsor.  The school opened on 34 June 1940 and closed on 25 August 1944.   The airfield was located southwest of the town near . A film, "Knights with Wings", about flight training in the BCATP, was filmed at the flying school at Windsor Mills. "An RCAF Pilot's Story 1939-1945: the Memoirs of Ernest E. Allen", recounts some of his experiences learning to fly at Windsor Mills in 1940-41.

On December 29, 1999, the village municipality of Saint-Grégoire-de-Greenlay was merged into the town of Windsor.

Demographics 

Mother tongue (2011)

See also
List of cities in Quebec

References

External links

 
Cities and towns in Quebec
BCATP
Military history of Canada during World War II